Jeju Oreum (Hangul: 오름, Hanja: 岳) is a rising small defunct volcano in the Jeju Island in South Korea. The word "oreum" is the Jeju dialect which implies the parasitic cone [Hangul: 측화산, Hanja: 側火山 (also Hangul: 기생화산, Hanja: 寄生火山) and the origin of the word "oreum" is a noun type of the word "climb" (Hangul: 오르다). The name refers to a small volcano within a main volcanic crater in Jeju-do and is usually applied to the hill in Jeju. The cinder cone, symbolizing the oreum, is a typical form of Jeju Oreum. The Oreum is divided into pyroclastic cone, tuff cone and lava dome depending on the nature of volcanic eruptions. The pyroclastic cones are volcanic bodies formed by the accumulation of volcanic clusters released into the air by explosive eruption.

More than 360 Oreums are distributed throughout Jeju Island from the mountains to coast, centered on Mt. Halla. These Oreums are characterized by the fact that their formations are not long and the prototype is well preserved due to the high permeability of rainwater. When talking about life in Jeju Island, Oreum is an indispensable object with Dol Hareubang (Hangul: 돌하르방) and is a symbol of Jeju Island. To the people of Jeju Island, it has been sacred as a site of folk religion. So, even now, in the areas, can be found traces of the site in which the villagers performed ancestral worship rituals. Oreum has also become the home of the villages as a base for people living in Jeju. The people gathered at the base of Oreums, planted the fields, farmed the fields, and raised livestock.

Efforts are being made to protect and manage Oreum as a target of sustainable development. It was designated as Natural Monument (No. 444) in 2005 and was registered as a World Heritage Site in 2007 under the name of 'Geomunoreum Lava Cave System' in Korea. The Geomunoreum lava tube system (Hangul: 거문오름 용암동굴계) is one of Jeju's three locations to be designated as UNESCO World Natural Heritage Sites.

Formation 

Magma erupting under pressure can solidify into scoria, which may fall and pile up around a crater to form circular and elliptical scoria cones and cinder cones. These are popularly known as Oreum in Jeju Island. There are about 360 such Oreum. Oreum are classified as cinder cones, lava domes, fault blocks, or cryptodomes.

If the internal density of the volcano sufficient to prevent collapse, a crater is formed, while a collapse produces a caldera. In the case of Mt. Halle, the crater Baekrokdam was formed. The typical caldera terrain on the Korea peninsula is Cheonji on Mt. Baekdu.

As the formation of the Oreum occurred in the Cenozoic era and is thus relatively recent, the initial topography of the volcanoes has been well preserved and frequently allows investigation of characteristics like spouting time and eruption specifics, in addition to influences on surface formation that lead to different oreum shapes (e.g., horseshoes, cones, circles, or hybrids).

Famous Oreum

Geomunoreum 

Geomunoreum (Hangul: 거문오름) forms boundary among Jocheon-eup Jeju-si, Namwon-eup Seogwipo-si and Pyoseon-myeon Seogwipo-si. The crater of top is complex form divided into east and west by ridge. The Oreum located Jeju 400 m of Jeju northeast bevel's sea is where many caves are concentrated. This Oreum is important because the lava flows that flowed from this volcano reached shoreline in the direction of the northeast along the terrain gradient and completed the lava tube structure including about 20 caves. The cave system of three direction are formed in this cave structure. The first cave system is Geomunoreum to Dangcheomul cave, which is about 13 km and leads to Banjul cave (Hangul: 뱅뒤굴), Manjanggul Cave (Hangul: 만장굴), Gimnyongsa cave (Hangul: 김녕사굴) and Dangcheomul cave (Hangul: 당처물굴) in lava cave structure formed nearly straight line. It can be traced on a topographic map. According to result of research on the Jeju natural heritage site, the scale of lava cave developed around Sunheul-ri Geomunoreum and the extension cave things have been confirmed to be world class. It was listed as UNESCO World Natural Heritage in June 2007 because of its high academic and natural heritage value.

Yongnunioreum 

Yongnunioreum (Hangul: 용눈이오름) is located in Jongdal-ri Gujwa-eup Jeju-si. The top of Yongnunioreum is composed of three peaks around the top of north-east direction, and there is an elliptical crater somewhat opened in the east–west direction. Overall, the shape of mountain is a horseshoe-shaped crater that spreads shallowly toward the east slope. At the foot of the west slope, there are a small parasitic volcano with marginated top and two conical parasitic volcanoes, Aloreum, and it is recorded as a complex Oreum, formed with two or more craters along with Yongnunioreum (Hangul: 용눈이오름) and Donurioreum (Hangul: 도너리오름). Especially, a complex volcano made up of various craters is known as an unusual shape. It is said that it is called Oreum because of the shape of Oreum, the figure of the dragons playing, lying and rising  in regard to the origin of the place name.

Geumoreum 

Geumoreum (Hangul: 금오름) is located in Geumak-ri Hallim-eup Jeju-si. It is one of the representative Oreum of western middle mountain area. It is parasitic volcanic with a large circular crater and a mountaintop crater lake. It has 2 peaks in the north and the south, leading to a low col in the east and the west. The mountaintop crater lake was in a great volume of water but the floor of the lake is exposed now. "Geum" (Hangul: 금) stands for God and it can be seen that it has been sacred from ancient time.

Saebyeoloreum 
Saebyeoloreum (Hangul: 새별오름) is located in Bongseong-ri Aewol-eup Jeju-si. Saebyeoloreum was also called the Saebeloreum or Saebiloreum. It was written as Hyobyeolak(Chinese: 曉別岳) in Sinjeungdonggukyeojiseungram (Hangul: 신증동국여지승람), Hyoseongak(Chinese: 曉星岳)in Tamraji (Hangul: 탐라지) and Sinseongak(Chinese: 新星岳) in Jejuguyneupji (Hangul: 제주군읍지). There is a view that Saebel and Saebil are Jeju dialect and they mean stars but it's uncertain. At the southern peak, there are ridges in the southwest, northwest, and northeast directions and there are 5 dagger-shaped mountaintops looked like a star. And Saebyeoloreum was the place where Goryeo[Korean] military under General Choi Young suppressed Mongolian military.

Darangswioreum 
Darangswioreum (Hangul: 다랑쉬오름) is located in Sehwa-ri, Gujwa-eup, Jeju-si. Although it is only 382 meters above sea level, it has all of the characteristics of a volcanic terrain and is called a 'queen of Oreum'. Darangswi (Hangul: 다랑쉬) is the dialect of Jeju which means the Moon. It is named Darangswi because the crater of mountain peaks looks like a full moon. There is a large, deep funnel-shaped circular crater in the mountain area. The outer circumference of this crater is about 1,500 m. It forms a long ellipse from south to north, the north is relatively flat. The depth of the crater is 115 m, which is same with Baekrokdam in Halla Mountain. Most Oreum are asymmetrically inclined, whereas Darangswioreum is arranged with concentric contour lines. There is a village of Darangswi, which was abandoned due to the 4.3 incident. In 1992, eleven of the remains of the victims were unearthed at the Darangswi cave.

Ttarabioreum 
Ttarabioreum (Hangul: 따라비오름) is located in Gasi-ri, Pyoseon-myeon, Seogwipo-si. One of the biggest features there is 3 craters. Several large and small peaks are connected with a smooth ridge. On the horseshoe-shaped foot of the mountain, there are debris slide layers as Dunjioreum in Gujwa-eup. It is said that it is considered to belong to a recent volcano erupted because of the debris slide. It is said that the name, Ttarabi (Hangul: 따라비) comes from the name Ttangharabeoji (hangul: 땅할아버지), which looks like a family with near oreums. Ttangharabeoji means grandfather for ground in English. Ttarabioreum is a typical autumn oreum. As well as the foot of the oreum, the surrounding mountain is a silver grass field. Back then, horses were released and raised in the great grassland.

Distribution of Jeju Oreum 

 Jeju City (Hangul: 제주시) : 59
 Seogwipo City (Hangul: 서귀포시) : 37
 North part of Jeju (Hangul: 북제주군) : 151 (Hallim Town 16, Aewol Town 50, Gujwa Town 40, Jocheon Town 30, Hangyeong-myeon 13, Udo-myeon 2)
 South part of Jeju (Hangul: 남제주군) : 121 (Daejeong Town 8, Namwon Town 29, Seongsan Town 22, Andeok-myeon 31, Pyoseon-myeon 31)

Classification by Type 

ㄴ(This is a chart from this source)

List of Oreums 
This is a list of...

Jeju City 
This is a list of 51 oreums in Jeju City (Hangul: 제주시)
 Gasatgioreum (Hangul: 가삿기오름) (also 가새기오름, 가삭봉)
 Gaeorioreum (Hangul: 개오리오름) (also 개월오름)
 Geochin (Hangul: 거친오름) (also 거친악, 거체악)
 Geolsioreum (Hangul: 걸시오름) (also 걸세오름)
 Geomeunoreum (Hangul: 검은오름) (also 금오름, 검오름)
 Golmeorioreum (Hangul: 골머리오름) (also 골머리)
 Gwangioreum (Hangul: 광이오름) (also 괭이오름)
 Gwonjeoreum (Hangul: 권제오름) (also 권재오름, 건제오름)
 Namjiseun (Hangul: 남짓은오름) (also 남조순오름)
 Norioreum (Hangul: 노리오름) (also 노리손이, 노루생이)
 Nunoreum (Hangul: 눈오름) (also 누운오름)
 Neunghwaoreum (Hangul: 능화오름) (also 능하오름)
 Dodeuloreum (Hangul: 도들오름) (also 도두봉, 도원봉)
 Doloreum (Hangul: 돌오름) (also 신산오름, 신선오름, 숫오름)
 Deulleoreum (Hangul: 들레오름)
 Deullioreum (Hangul: 들리오름) (also 두루머를)
 Muljangori (Hangul: 물장오리) (also 물장올)
 Minoreum (Hangul: 민오름) (also 뒷민오름, 무녜오름)
 Minoreum (Hangul: 민오름) (also 족은민오름)
 Balgeunoreum (Hangul: 밝은오름)
 Bas-semi (Hangul: 밧세미) (also 밭생이)
 Bang-ilbong (Hangul: 방일봉) (also 방일이동산)
 Baedurioreum (Hangul: 베두리오름)
 Berioreum (Hangul: 베리오름) (also 별도봉)
 Bong-gaeoreum (Hangul: 봉개오름) (also 봉아오름, 봉아름)
 Bulkandioreum (Hangul: 불칸디오름)
 Saraoreum (Hangul: 사라오름) (also 사라봉)
 Samgakbong (Hangul: 삼각봉)
 Sang-yeooreum (Hangul: 상여오름)
 Sungjin-ioreum (Hangul: 성진이오름) (also 개오름)
 Semioreum (Hangul: 세미오름) (also 삼의양오름)
 Sosanoreum (Hangul: 소산오름)
 Ssalsonoreum (Hangul: 쌀손오름) (also 쌀손장오리)
 Ansemi (Hangul: 안세미) (also 명도오름, 조리세미오름, 형제봉)
 Aloreum (Hangul: 알오름)
 Eoseumsaengoreum (Hangul: 어승생오름) (also 어승생, 어스승이)
 Yeolanjioreum (Hangul: 열안지오름) (also 연난지, 여난지)
 Odeusing oreum (Hangul: 오드싱오름) (also 오두싱이)
 Wang-gwanreng (Hangul: 왕관릉) (also 왕관바위, 연딧돌)
 Wondang-oreum (Hangul: 원당오름) (also 원당봉, 웬당오름)
 Jang-gumok (Hangul: 장구목)
 Jeolmuloreum (Hangul: 절물오름)[큰대나]
 Julmuloreum (Hangul: 절물오름)[족은대나]
 Jok-eundre (Hangul: 족은드레) (also 족은두레왓)
 Jinmulgumburi (Hangul: 진물굼부리) (also 진머리)
 Chilg-oreum (Hangul: 칡오름) (also 칠오름)
 Keun-norison-i (Hangul: 큰노리손이) (also 노리오름)
 Keundre (Hangul: 큰드레) (also 큰두레왓)
 Teyeokjang-ori (Hangul: 테역장오리) (also 테역장올)
 Heulgbulg-eun-oreum (Hangul: 흙붉은오름)

Seogwipo City 
This is a list of 31 oreums in Seogwipo City (Hangul: 서귀포시)
 Gaksibawuoreum (Hangul: 각시바우오름) (also 각시바위, 각수바위)
 Gaesgeorioreum (Hangul: 갯거리오름) (also 갯그르)
 Georin-oreum (Hangul: 거린오름) (also 거린사슴, 거린사슴오름)
 Gogeunsan (Hangul: 고근산) (also 고공산)
 Gusanbong (Hangul: 구산봉) (also 개오름)
 Gungsan (Hangul: 궁산) (also 활오름)
 Nokhajiak (Hangul: 녹하지악) (also 녹하지오름)
 Daraeoreum (Hangul: 다래오름) (also 도래오름)
 Deodeoreum (Hangul: 더데오름) (also 더디오름, 더더오름)
 Mangbat (Hangul: 망밭)
 Moraiak (Hangul: 모라이악) (also 모라지, 모라봉, 냇새오름)
 Miaksan (Hangul: 미악산) (also 솔오름, 쌀오름)
 Bang-aeoreum (Hangul: 방애오름) (also 방에오름, 침악)
 Bupjung-ak (Hangul: 법정악) (also 법정이오름)
 Beritnaeoreum (Hangul: 베릿내오름)
 Borom-i (Hangul: 보롬이)
 Bolreoreum (Hangul: 볼레오름) (also 볼래오름, 존자오름)
 Sammaebong (Hangul: 삼매봉) (also 세미양오름)
 Seoloreum (Hangul: 설오름) (also 서리오름)
 Sioreum (Hangul: 시오름) (also 수컷오름, 숫오름)
 Eojum-ioreum (Hangul: 어점이오름) (also 어점이악)
 Yeongchun-oreum (Hangul: 영천오름) (also 영천악, 영세미오름)
 Obaekjang-gun (Hangul: 오백장군) (also 오백나한, 천불암)
 Ubooreum (Hangul: 우보오름) (also 우보악, 우보름)
 Wollasan (Hangul: 월라산) (also 도라미, 돌라미오름)
 Wolsanbong (Hangul: 월산봉)
 Injeong-oreum (Hangul: 인정오름)
 Jejikioreum (Hangul: 제지기오름) (also 절오름)
 Chilg-oreum (Hangul: 칡오름) (also 칠오름, 칙오름)
 Hanon (Hangul: 하논)

Aewol Town 
This is a list of 32 oreums in Aewol Town (Hangul: 애월읍)
 Geumduk-oreum (Hangul: 금덕오름) (also 검은덕이, 검은데기, 검은덕오름)
 Gonaeoreum (Hangul: 고내오름) (also 고니오름, 망오름, 고내봉)
 Gwaoreum (Hangul: 과오름) (also 곽오름, 큰오름, 샛오름)
 Geoioreum (Hangul: 괴오름) (also 괴미오름)
 Gwetmuloreum (Hangul: 궷물오름)
 Geukrakoreum (Hangul: 극락오름)
 Nokkome (Hangul: 노꼬메) (also 성제오름)
 Nokkomejok-eun-oreum (Hangul: 노꼬메 족은오름)
 Norooreum (Hangul: 노로오름)
 Nunoreum (Hangul: 눈오름)
 Nuunoreum (Hangul: 누운오름) (also 논오름)
 Daraeoreum (Hangul: 다래오름)
 Mulmae (Hangul: 물메) (also 물미, 수산봉)
 Bal-ioreum (Hangul: 발이오름) (also 바리메, 큰바리메)
 Bukdol-ajin-oreum (Hangul: 북돌아진오름)
 Bulgeunoreum (Hangul: 붉은오름)
 Binneoreum (Hangul: 빈네오름) (also 채악, 잠악)
 Sajebidongsan (Hangul: 사제비동산) (also 새잽이오름, 사제비오름, 조접악)
 Salpinoreum (Hangul: 살핀오름)
 Samhyungjeoreum (Hangul: 삼형제오름) (also 세오름)
 Saebyeoloreum (Hangul: 새별오름) (also샛별오름)
 Anoreum (Hangul: 안오름)
 Eodooreum (Hangul] 어도오름) (also 도노미)
 Utseoreum (Hangul: 웃세오름) (also 윗세오름)
 Idaloreum (Hangul: 이달오름) (also 이달봉)
 Isrung-oreum (Hangul: 이스렁오름)
 Jokeunbarime (Hangul: 족은바리메)
 Cheon-aoreum (Hangul: 천아오름) (also 초낭오름)
 Chetmang-oreum (Hangul: 쳇망오름) (also 망체오름)
 Bagumjioreum (Hangul: 바굼지오름) (also 파군봉)
 Poknang-oreum (Hangul: 폭낭오름)
 Handaeoreum (Hangul: 한대오름)

Hallim Town 
This is a list of 16 oreums in Hallim Town (Hangul: 한림읍)
 Gatgeorioreum (Hangul: 갯거리오름) (also 갯걸오름, 개꼬리오름)
 Geum-oreum (Hangul: 금오름) (also 검악, 검은오름)
 Nuun-oreum (Hangul: 누운오름) (also 눈오름)
 Neujirioreum (Hangul: 느지리오름) (also 망오름)
 Mundojioreum (Hangul: 문도지오름) (also 문돗지)
 Bulgeun-oreum (Hangul: 벌근오름) (also 밝은오름)
 Myeongwol-oreum (Hangul: 명월오름) (also 밝은오름)
 Balgeun-oreum (Hangul: 밝은오름)
 Bangjuoreum (Hangul: 방주오름) (also 방지오름, 방제오름)
 Biyangbong (Hangul: 비양봉) (also 가재, 큰암메창, 족은암메창, 서산)
 Seonsooreum (Hangul: 선소오름)
 Semisooreum (Hangul: 세미소오름) (also 세미소)
 Jungmul-al-oruem (Hangul: 정물알오름)
 Jungmul-oreum (Hangul: 정물오름)
 Jungwol-oreum (Hangul: 정월오름)
 Chun-aoreum (Hangul: 천아오름) (also 초낭오름, 처남오름, 처나름)

Daejeong Town 
This is a list of 8 oreums in Daejeong Town (Hangul: 대정읍)
 Gasioreum (Hangul: 가시오름) (also 가스름)
 Noknamoreum (Hangul: 녹남오름) (also 녹남봉)
 Dondumioreum (Hangul: 돈두미오름) (also 돈대미, 돈도름)
 Dong-al-oreum (Hangul: 동알오름)
 Moseulgaeoreum (Hangul: 모슬개오름) (also 모슬봉, 모살개오름)
 Borom-i (Hangul: 보롬이) (also 보름이)
 Sut-al-oreum (Hangul: 섯알오름) (also 알봉)
 Song-aksan (Hangul: 송악산) (also 절울이)

Seongsan Town 
This is a list of 18 oreums in Seongsan Town (Hangul: 성산읍)
 Gungdaeoreum (Hangul: 궁대오름) (also 궁대악)
 Nasirioreum (Hangul: 나시리오름)
 Nangot-oreum (Hangul: 남곶오름) (also 낭곶오름, 낭끼오름, 남케오름)
 Namsanbong (Hangul: 남산봉) (also 망오름)
 Daesusanbong (Hangul: 대수산봉) (also 큰물뫼, 물미오름, 큰물미)
 Daewangsan (Hangul: 대왕산) (also 왕뫼, 왕이미, 왕이메)
 Dokjaeoreum (Hangul: 독재오름) (also 독자봉, 오름삿기)
 Dolmi (Hangul: 돌미) (also 돌리미)
 Dusanbong (Hangul: 두산봉) (also 말미오름, 멀미오름)
 Duigup-eun-i (Hangul: 뒤굽은이) (also 뒤곱은이, 뒤꾸부니)
 Mogurioreum (Hangul: 모구리오름) (also 모골이)
 Bonjioreum (Hangul: 본지오름)
 Sungsan (Hangul: 성산) (also 일출봉)
 Sosusanbong (Hangul: 소수산봉) (also 족은물뫼, 족은물미)
 Sowangsan (Hangul: 소왕산) (also 족응왕뫼, 족은왕이미)
 Siksanbong (Hangul: 식산봉) (also 바오름)
 Yugun-eoreum (Hangul: 유건에오름) (also 유건이, 이기네)
 Tong-oreum (Hangul: 통오름)

Gujwa Town 
This is a list of 33 oreums in Gujwa Town (Hangul: 구좌읍)
 Gam-eun-ioreum (Hangul: 감은이오름)
 Geoseunsaemioreum (Hangul: 거슨새미오름) (also 거슨세미, 세미오름, 샘오름)
 Geochin-oreum (Hangul: 거친오름)
 Nop-eun-oreum (Hangul: 높은오름)
 Darangswioreum (Hangul: 다랑쉬오름) (also 달랑쉬, 도랑쉬)
 Dang-oreum (Hangul: 당오름)
 Donggum-eun-oreum (Hangul: 동검은오름) (also 동검은이, 거미오름)
 Dot-oreum (Hangul: 돝오름) (also 돛오름, 비지오름)
 Dunjioreum (Hangul: 둔지오름) (also 둔지봉)
 Duigup-eun-i (Hangul: 뒤굽은이)
 Myosanbong (Hangul: 묘산봉) (also 괴살미, 고살미, 괴살메)
 Munseok-ioreum (Hangul: 문석이오름)
 Minoreum (Hangul: 민오름)
 Batdol-oreum (Hangul: 밧돌오름) (also 밖돌오름, 밭돌오름)
 Buk-oreum (Hangul: 북오름)
 Bichimioreum (Hangul: 비치미오름) (also 비찌미)
 Seonjok-ioreum (Hangul: 선족이오름) (also 웃선족이, 알선족이)
 Sungbul-oreum (Hangul: 성불오름) (also 성불암, 성보람)
 Sonjioreum (Hangul: 손지오름) (also 손자봉)
 Sik-eun-ioreum (Hangul: 식은이오름) (also 사근이오름)
 Akkeundaranswioreum (Hangul: 아끈다랑쉬오름)
 Abuoreum (Hangul: 아부오름) (also 앞오름, 압오름, 아보름)
 Aldol-oreum (Hangul: 안돌오름)
 Anchin-oreum (Hangul: 안친오름) (also 아진오름)
 Eodaeoreum (Hangul: 어대오름) (also 어두름)
 Yongnun-ioreum ([angul: 용눈이오름)
 Eunwolbong (Hangul: 은월봉) (also 윤드리오름)
 Ipsanbong (Hangul: 입산봉) (also 삿갓오름, 망오름)
 Jucheoreum (Hangul: 주체오름) (also 흙붉은오름)
 Jimibong (Hangul: 지미봉) (also 지깍오름)
 Cheoreum (Hangul: 체오름) (also 골체오름)
 Chilg-oreum (Hangul: 칡오름)
 Keundol-imi (Hangul: 큰돌이미) (also 도리미, 돌리미)

Jocheon Town 
This is a list of 25 oreums in Jocheon Town (Hangul: 조천읍)
 Geomunoreum (Hangul: 거문오름) (also 서검은이, 서검은오름)
 Gugeuneoreum (Hangul: 구그네오름) (also 가시네오름)
 Salhanioreum (Hangul: 살한이오름) (also 궤펭이오름, 살하니오름, 궤펜이)
 Kkakkeulaegi (Hangul]: 까끄래기) (also 꼬끄래기)
 Kkoekkolioreum (Hangul: 꾀꼬리오름) (also 것구리오름, 앵악, 원오름)
 Neobgeoli (Hangul: 넙거리)
 Neubseoli (Hangul: 늡서리)
 Dangoreum (Hangul: 당오름)
 Daecheonioreum (Hangul: 대천이오름)
 Dombaeoreum (Hangul: 돔배오름) (also 돔바름)
 Malchas (Hangul: 말찻) (also 몰찻)
 Mulchasoreum (Hangul: 물찻오름)
 Minoreum (Hangul: 민오름)
 Banongoreum (Hangul: 바농오름) (also 바늘오름, 바능오름)
 Bangaeoreum (Hangul: 방애오름) (also 큰방애오름, 구악)
 Budaeag (Hangul: 부대악) (also 부대오름)
 Busoag (Hangul: 부소악) (also 부소오름, 새몰메)
 Sangumbuli (Hangul: 산굼부리)
 Seoubong (Hangul: 서우봉) (also 서모오름)
 Semioleum (Hangul: 세미오름) (also 샘이오름)
 Albamoreum (Hangul: 알밤오름) (also 알바매기)
 Eohuoreum (Hangul: 어후오름) (also 어후름)
 Ujinjebi (Hangul: 우진제비) (also우전제비)
 Usbamoreum (Hangul: 웃밤오름) (also 웃바매기)
 Jigeulioreum (Hangul: 지그리오름) (also 지기리오름)

Namwon Town 
This is a list of 23 oreums in Namwon Town (Hangul: 남원읍)
 Geolin-oreum (Hangul: 거린오름)
 Geolse-oreum (Hangul: 걸세오름) (also 걸시오름, 걸쇠오름, 걸서악)
 Goioreum (Hangul: 고이오름) (also 고리오름, 고이악)
 Gwepen-i (Hangul: 궤펜이) (also 물오름)
 Neogsioreum (Hangul: 넉시오름) (also 넋이오름, 넉시악)
 Neoggeolioreum (Hangul: 넉거리오름) (also 넙거리)
 Nongooreum (Hangul: 논고오름) (also 논고름)
 Dongsuag (Hangul: 동수악)
 Meoche-oreum (Hangul: 머체오름) (also 마체오름)
 Mul-yeong-ali (Hangul: 물영아리)
 Min-oreum (Hangul: 민오름) (also 민악산)
 Bolioreum (Hangul: 보리오름) (also 보리악)
 Salaoreum (Hangul: 사라오름)
 Salyeoni (Hangul: 사려니) (also 사랭이오름, 소랭이오름)
 Saeng-gi-oreum (Hangul: 생기오름) (also 생길이오름, 생기악)
 Seongneol-oreum (Hangul: 성널오름)
 Suag (Hangul: 수악)
 Yeojeol-ag (Hangul: 여절악) (also 예절이오름, 여쩌리)
 Yechonmang (Hangul: 예촌망) (also 망오름, 호촌봉)
 Unjioreum (Hangul: 운지오름) (also 운지악, 운주오름, 운주름)
 Ung-ag (Hangul 웅악) (also 쇠기오름, 숫오름, 소기오름)
 Iseung-ag (Hangul: 이승악) (also 이승이오름, 이슥이오름)
 Jabaeoreum (Hangul: 자배오름) (also 자배봉, 저바니오름)

Andeok-myeon 
This is a list of 30 oreums in Andeok-myeon (Hangul: 안덕면)
 Gamnang-oreum (Hangul: 감낭오름) (also 감남오름)
 Geolin-oreum (Hangul: 거린오름) (also 북오름)
 Goesuchi (Hangul: 괴수치) (also 고수치)
 Gunsan (Hangul: 군산) (also 굴뫼오름, 굴메, 군뫼)
 Geumsan (Hangul: 금산)
 Namsong-i-oreum (Hangul: 남송이오름) (also 남소로기)
 Neobge-oreum (Hangul: 넙게오름) (also 광쳉이오름, 광해악)
 Non-oreum (Hangul: 논오름)
 Dansan (Hangul: 단산) (also 바굼지오름, 바구미오름)
 Dang-oreum (Hangul: 당오름)
 Daebyeong-ag (Hangul: 대병악) (also 골른오름, 여진머리오름, 큰오름)
 Doneolioreum (Hangul: 도너리오름) (also 돌오름, 돝내린오름)
 Dol-oreum (Hangul: 돌오름)
 Dombag-i (Hangul: 돔박이)
 Mabog-i-oreum (Hangul: 마복이오름) (also 마보기, 맞보기)
 Muag (Hangul: 무악) (also 무오름, 개오름, 믜오름, 미악, 술악)
 Balg-eun-oreum (Hangul: 밝은오름) (also 벌근오름)
 Sanbangsan (Hangul: 산방산) (also 굴산)
 Sobyeong-ag (Hangul: 소병악) (also 족은오름)
 Sinsan-oreum (Hangul: 신산오름)
 Sseog-eundali (Hangul: 썩은다리) (also 사간다리동산)
 Eooreum (Hangul: 어오름) (also 어우름)
 Yeong-ali-oreum (Hangul: 영아리오름) (also 서영아리)
 Wang-ime (Hangul: 왕이메) (also)
 Yongmeoli (Hangul: 용머리) (also)
 Wonsuag (Hangul: 원수악) (also 원물오름)
 Wollabong (Hangul: 월라봉) (also 도래오름)
 Idon-i-oreum (Hangul: 이돈이오름) (also 이돈이)
 Jog-eundaebiag (Hangul: 족은대비악) (also 조근대비악)
 Hanuibog-oreum (Hangul: 하늬복오름) (also 하늬복이, 하늬보기, 하네보기)

Pyoseon-myeon 
This is a list of 26 oreums in Pyoseon-myeon (Hangul: 표선면)
 Gamun-i-oreum (Hangul: 가문이오름) (also 감은이오름, 거문오름)
 Gase-oreum (Hangul: 가세오름)
 Gabseon-i-oreum (Hangul: 갑선이오름)
 Gaeoreum (Hangul: 개오름)
 Gudulioreum (Hangul: 구두리오름)
 Dalsanbong (Hangul: 달산봉) (also 탈산봉, 당산봉)
 Daelogsan (Hangul: 대록산) (also 큰사슴이)
 Ttalabioreum (Hangul: 따라비오름) (also 따래비, 땅하래비)
 Maeoreum (Hangul: 매오름)
 Mojioreum (Hangul: 모지오름) (also 뭇지오름)
 Baegyagioreum (Hangul: 백약이오름)
 Beonneol-oreum (Hangul: 번널오름) (also 번늘오름)
 Byeong-gos-oreum (Hangul: 병곳오름) (also 뱅곳오름, 안좌오름)
 Bugmangsan (Hangul: 북망산) (also 토산봉 알오름)
 Bulg-eun-oreum (Hangul: 붉은오름) (also)
 Saekkioreum (Hangul: 새끼오름) (also 샛기오름)
 Seol-oreum (Hangul: 설오름) (also 서오름, 서을악)
 Sologsan (Hangul: 소록산) (also 족은사슴이)
 Sosoleum (Hangul: 소소름) (also 쇠오름, 솔오름)
 Aseumseon-i (Hangul: 아슴선이) (also 아심선이)
 Yeomun-yeong-ali (Hangul: 여문영아리)
 Yeongjusan (Hangul: 영주산)
 Jangjaoreum (Hangul: 장자오름)
 Jwabomi (Hangul: 좌보미)
 Chesmang-oreum (Hangul: 쳇망오름)
 Tosanbong (Hangul: 토산봉) (also 망오름)

Hangyeong-myeon
This is a list of 12 oreums in Hangyeong-myeon (Hangul: 한경면)
 Gamaoreum (Hangul: 가마오름)
 Gamechang (Hangul: 가메창) (also 암메)
 Gub-eun-oreum (Hangul: 굽은오름) (also 구분오름)
 Dangsanbong (Hangul: 당산봉) (also 당오름, 차귀오름)
 Maoreum (Hangul: 마오름)
 Majung-oreum (Hangul: 마중오름) (also 마종이)
 Saesin-oreum (Hangul: 새신오름) (also 신서악, 조소악)
 Song-a-oreum (Hangul: 송아오름)
 Suwolbong (Hangul: 수월봉) (also 노꼬물오름, 물노리오름)
 Igye-oreum (Hangul: 이계오름)
 Jeojioreum (Hangul: 저지오름) (also 닥몰오름, 새오름)
 Panpooreum (Hangul: 판포오름) (also 널개오름)

Udo-myeon 
This is a list of 1 oreums in Udo-myeon (Hangul: 우도면)
 Soemeolioreum (Hangul: 쇠머리오름) (also 섬머리)

See also 
 Jeju Island
 Jeju Volcanic Island and Lava Tubes
 Geomunoreum Lava Tube System
 World Heritage Sites in South Korea

References 

 오창명, 『제주도 오름 이름의 종합적 연구』 (제주대학교 출판부, 2007)
 김승태, 한동호, 『제주의 오름 368』 (대동 출판사)
 김승태·한동호 외, 『오름길라잡이』1 (대동출판사, 2005)
 『한국지명유래집』- 전라·제주편 (국토해양부·국토지리정보원, 2008, 2010)
 『제주의 오름』 (제주도, 1998)
 오창명, 『제주도 오름과 마을이름』(제주대학교 출판부, 1998)
 『천미천』 (한라일보사, 2000)
 현용준 「제주도 무속자료사전」
 문무병 「제주도무속신화」
 김종철, 『제주도 기생화산 답사기: 오름나그네』 (높은오름, 1995)
 이문원·손인석, 『제주도는 어떻게 만들어진 섬일까』 (춘광 출판사, 1983)
 김태윤, “제주 오름의 합리적인 보전 및 관리 방안 연구”
 NAVER Encyclopedia
 Encyclopedia of Korean Local Culture, The Academy of Korean Studies
 Tourist Site 'VISIT JEJU', Jeju Tourism Organization
 Digital Encyclopedia of Jeju  Grand Culture
 Korean Wikipedia
 Footnote

External links 
 네이버 지식백과- 오름
 디지털서귀포문화사전- 오름
 한국향토문화전자대전- 제주의 화산 오름
 JejuOreum
 JejuOreum제주오름
 Jeju World Natural Heritage Center
 양영태와 함께 가는 오름나들이
 오름이야기
 VISIT JEJU- 제주 오름 관광지
 거문오름
 용눈이오름

Parasitic cones
Volcanology
Landforms of Jeju Province